Knipowitschia mermere is a species of fresh water goby endemic to Lake Marmara and the associated basin of the River Gediz in Turkey where it can be found in shallow, poorly oxygenated water with plentiful weed growth.  This species can reach a length of  TL.

References

mermere
Freshwater fish of Western Asia
Endemic fauna of Turkey
Taxonomy articles created by Polbot
Fish described in 1995